Eicosameric refers to biological polymers or multimers having exactly twenty 'monomers' (or 20 repeating components).

Protein complexes having exactly 20 subunits are referred to as  eicosameric (or sometimes 20-Meric).

Examples of eicosameric protein complexes include;
 The rat GTPCHI/GFRP stimulatory complex (involved in regulating sub cellular signalling cascades)

See also
 Protein quaternary structure

External links
The Macromolecular Structure Database (MSD) at the European Bioinformatics Institute (EBI) serves a list of the Probabable Quaternary Structure (PQS) for every protein in the Protein Data Bank (PDB).
 The Protein Interfaces, Surfaces and Assemblies (Pisa) server at the MSD.

Protein structure
Polymers